Progressive music is a type of music that experiments with alternative routes. It may also refer to:

Genres
 Progressive folk, originating in the 1930s
 Progressive jazz, referring to various genres of jazz from the 1940s–70s
 Progressive bluegrass, originating in the 1960s and 1970s
 Progressive pop, originating in the mid-1960s
 Progressive rock, originating in the late 1960s
 Art rock, originating in the late 1960s, sometimes used synonymously with progressive rock
 Progressive metal, a fusion between progressive rock and heavy metal originating in the mid-1980s
 Progressive country, originating in the 1970s
 Progressive house, originating in the early 1990s

Other
 Progg, a Swedish political music movement originating in the late 1960s

See also

 Prog (disambiguation)
 Progressive (disambiguation)
 Progressive jazz (disambiguation)